The Museum of Flight is a private non-profit air and space museum in the Seattle metropolitan area. It is located at the southern end of King County International Airport  (Boeing Field) in the city of Tukwila, immediately south of Seattle. It was established in 1965 and is fully accredited by the American Alliance of Museums. As the largest private air and space museum in the world, it also hosts large K–12 educational programs.

The museum attracts over 500,000 visitors every year, and also serves more than 140,000 students annually through its onsite programs: a Challenger Learning Center, an Aviation Learning Center, and a summer camp (ACE), as well as outreach programs that travel throughout Washington and Oregon.

History 
The Museum of Flight can trace its roots back to the Pacific Northwest Aviation Historical Foundation, which was founded in 1965 to recover and restore a 1929 Boeing 80A-1, which had been discovered in Anchorage, Alaska. The restoration took place over a 16-year period, and after completion, was put on display as a centerpiece for the museum. In 1968, the name "Museum of Flight" first appeared in use in a 10,000-square-foot facility, rented at the Seattle Center. Planning began at this time for a more permanent structure, and preliminary concepts were drafted.

In 1975, The William E. Boeing Red Barn was acquired for one dollar from the Port of Seattle, which had taken possession of it after Boeing abandoned it during World War II. The 1909 all-wooden Red Barn, the original home of the company, was barged two miles (3 km) up the Duwamish River to its current location at the southwestern end of Boeing Field. Fundraising was slow in the late 1970s, and after restoration, the two-story Red Barn was opened to the public in 1983.

That year a funding campaign was launched, so capital could be raised for construction of the T.A. Wilson Great Gallery. The gallery's structure is built in a space frame lattice structure and holds more than 20 hanging aircraft, including a Douglas DC-3 weighing more than nine tons.

The museum's education programs grew significantly with the building of a Challenger Learning Center in 1992. This interactive exhibit allows students to experience a Space Shuttle mission. It includes a mock-up NASA mission control, and experiments from all areas of space research.

At the same time, one of the museum's most widely recognized and popular artifacts, the Lockheed M-21, a modified Lockheed A-12 Oxcart designed to carry the Lockheed D-21 reconnaissance drones, was placed on the floor at the center of the Great Gallery, after being fully restored.

The first jet-powered Air Force One (1959–1962, SAM 970), a Boeing VC-137B, was flown to Boeing Field in 1996; it arrived in June and was opened to visitors in October. Retired from active service earlier that year, it is on loan from the Air Force Museum. Originally parked on the east side of the museum, it was driven across East Marginal Way and now resides in the museum's Airpark, where it is open to public walkthroughs.

In 1997, the museum opened the first full scale, interactive Air Traffic Control tower exhibit. The tower overlooks the Boeing Field runways, home to one of the thirty busiest airports in the country. The exhibit offers a glimpse into what it is like to be an air traffic controller.

The next major expansion was opened in 2004, with the addition of the J. Elroy McCaw Personal Courage Wing, named after J. Elroy McCaw, an area businessman, entrepreneur and World War II veteran. North of the Red Barn, the wing has  of exhibit space on two floors, with more than 25 World War I and World War II aircraft. It also has large collection of model aircraft, including every plane from both wars. Many of these aircraft were from the collection of the Champlin Fighter Museum, formerly in Mesa, Arizona, which closed in 2003. The wing opened on June 6, the sixtieth anniversary of D-Day.

In June 2010, the museum broke ground on a $12 million new building to house a Space Shuttle it hoped to receive from NASA, named the Charles Simonyi Space Gallery. The new building includes multisensory exhibits that emphasize stories from the visionaries, designers, pilots, and crews of the Space Shuttle and other space related missions. The gallery opened to the public in November 2012.

Though the museum did not receive one of the four remaining Shuttles, it did receive the Full Fuselage Trainer (FFT), a Shuttle mockup that was used to train all Space Shuttle astronauts.  Because it is a trainer and not an actual Shuttle, small group (no more than six persons, minimum age 10, maximum height 6' 4") guided tours of the interior are available, for an extra charge. The FFT began arriving in various pieces beginning in 2012. The cockpit and two sections of the payload bay arrived via NASA's Super Guppy.

During the 50th anniversary celebrations for Apollo 11 in 2019, the Museum of Flight hosted a traveling Smithsonian exhibit with the Apollo Command Module Columbia, which was used during the first moon landing.

Aircraft on display 
The Museum of Flight has more than 150 aircraft in its collection, including:

Lockheed Model 10-E Electrafaithfully restored by pilot Linda Finch to match the aircraft Amelia Earhart was piloting when she disappeared over the Pacific Ocean
Boeing 747 the first flight-worthy B747, City of Everett. Its registration number is N7470, and it was named after the city of Everett, Washington. Its first flight was on February 9, 1969, and was retired in 1990. (Open for walkthrough)
Boeing VC-137B SAM 970 the first presidential jet, which served in the presidential fleet from 1959 to 1996 (open for walkthrough)
Concorde 214(British Airways), registration G-BOAG (open for walkthrough). This is one of only four Concordes on display outside Europe, with the other three being near Washington, in New York, and in Barbados.
Caproni Ca.20 the world's first fighter plane from World War I.  The one on display at the Museum of Flight was the only one ever built.
de Havilland Comet The world's first jet airliner. First flew 1949, in production 1952 to 1964. This is currently stored at their restoration center at Paine Field in Everett.
Lockheed D-21 unmanned reconnaissance drone, displayed mounted on the M-21
Lockheed M-21 the sole surviving M-21 a variant of the Lockheed A-12.
Lockheed SR-71 Blackbird The surviving cockpit section of 61-7977, an SR-71 that crashed in 1968.
Boeing 737 the prototype Boeing 737-100, formerly operated by NASA as NASA 515.
Boeing 787 Dreamliner N787BX, The third 787-8 prototype. Open for walkthroughs.
Lockheed Martin RQ-3 DarkStar the second DarkStar UAV prototype

MacCready Gossamer Albatross IIhuman-powered aircraft.
Aerocar International's Aerocarone of five surviving Aerocars, (automobiles with detachable wings and propeller).
LearAvia Lear Fanprototype N626BL
Douglas DC-2 one of only two remaining airworthy DC-2s.
Boeing 80Athe only surviving 80A, flown by Bob Reeve in Alaska.
Boeing 727-100 (E1)An ex-United Airlines B727-100, The Original Prototype.
Lockheed L-1049G Super ConstellationAn ex-Trans-Canada Air Lines Super Constellation, located originally at the Toronto Pearson International Airport which was purchased in a controversial transaction in 2005. It is currently on display at the airpark.
Lamson L-106 Alcorthe world's first pressurized sailplane.

Exhibits and facilities 
On its grounds is the Personal Courage Wing (PCW) with 28 World War I and World War II aircraft from several countries including Germany, Russia, and Japan.

There is also the "Red Barn", a registered historic site also known as Building No. 105. Built in 1909, the building was used during the early 1900s as Boeing's original manufacturing plant. Through photographs, film, oral histories, and restoration of work stations the exhibits in the Red Barn illustrate how wooden aircraft structure with fabric overlays were manufactured in the early years of aviation and provides a history of aviation development through 1958.

In June 2007 the museum opened a new space exhibit: "Space: Exploring the New Frontier", which traces the evolution of space flight from the times of Dr. Robert Goddard to the present and into future commercial spaceflight.

Restoration facility 
The museum maintains a restoration facility at Paine Field in Everett with about 39 ongoing projects including a de Havilland Comet 4 jet airliner, a Jetstar, and the Boeing 2707 mockup, among many.

Museum of Flight Library and Archives

The Harl V. Brackin Library at the Museum of Flight was founded in 1985.  As of 2011, it contains 66,000 books and subscribes to 100 periodicals.  It specializes in aerospace and aviation. There is also an online catalog.

The Museum of Flight Archives is accessible to the public via the Kenneth H. Dalhberg Aviation Research Center. It includes millions of photographs and thousands of linear feet of manuscript materials. Highlights of the collections include the Gordon S. Williams photographic collection, the Peter M. Bowers Photographic Collection, the David D. Hatfield Aviation History Collection, the Norm Taylor Photographic Collection, the Elrey B. Jeppesen Aviation History and Navigation Collection, the American Fighter Aces Association Archives, the Lear Corporation Archives, and the Wright Airplane Company Collection.

In December 2017, the Archives launched a digital repository. The site features digitized materials from archival, library, and artifact collections. In April 2019 the Archives began to make archival collections available and searchable online.

Other facilities

In September 2013, Raisbeck Aviation High School (formerly Aviation High School) opened in a new facility directly north of the museum's Airpark.  The school is operated by Highline Public Schools as a STEM school with a focus on aviation.  The school operates in partnership with the museum (which owns the land), Boeing, and other members of the local aviation industry. The facility will also be used for the museum's summer education programs when school is not in session.

The new Aviation Pavilion spans the gap between the high school and the Space Gallery. The cover allows aircraft which were seasonally brought out, such as the museum's Boeing B-17 Flying Fortress and Boeing B-29 Superfortress, to be put permanently on display. The Pavilion, constructed as part of the museum's comprehensive "Inspiration Begins Here!" campaign, opened to the public in June 2016 and contains 18 of the museum's most iconic aircraft. The 140,000 square foot building doubles the museum's exhibit space, and was built with help from Sellen Construction and Seneca Real Estate Development.

In late May 2019, the museum opened the  featuring the fully restored B-52 Midnight Express as the culmination of Project Welcome Home. The park is free to the public.

See also
 List of aerospace museums

References
Notes

Bibliography

 Ogden, Bob. Great Aircraft Collections of the World. New York: Gallery Books, 1986. .

External links

Aerospace museums in Washington (state)
Historic American Buildings Survey in Washington (state)
Museums established in 1965
1965 establishments in Washington (state)
Museum of Flight
Museum of Flight
Science museums in Washington (state)
Museums in Seattle
Industry museums in Washington (state)
Museum of Flight
Museum of Flight
Museum of Flight